Giannis Sardelis (born 3 November 2000) is a Greek professional footballer who plays as an attacking midfielder for Super League 2 club Panathinaikos B.

References

2000 births
Living people
Greek footballers
Greece youth international footballers
Super League Greece players
Super League Greece 2 players
Panathinaikos F.C. players
AEK Athens F.C. players
Association football midfielders
Panathinaikos F.C. B players
Footballers from the Peloponnese
People from Messenia